Maysville is an unincorporated community in Washington Township, Daviess County, Indiana.

History
Maysville was laid out in 1834 on the Wabash and Erie Canal.

Geography

References

Unincorporated communities in Daviess County, Indiana
Unincorporated communities in Indiana